Westerwolde may refer to:
 Westerwolde (region), a region in the Netherlands
 Westerwolde (municipality), a municipality in the region